Nanambinia Station is a pastoral lease located south of Balladonia, Western Australia on the Eyre Highway in the Goldfields-Esperance region.

Harry Dimer took up the lease in 1896. The property takes its name from the Indigenous Australian word for a willow-like tree that is native to the area.

A unique record of life on the station appeared in a series of letters from Nanambinia (via Israelite Bay) to "Aunt Mary" (the "Childrens Corner") in the Western Australian weekly newspaper the  Western Mail, by the girls of the Diner family, Annie and Bertha.

The Dimer family were long associated with the lease.

The Dimers had bred sheep, cattle, horses, camels and donkeys on the station.

In 1950 only 700 sheep were to be sheared and the property was being run by Fred Dimer.

See also
 Noondoonia Station
List of ranches and stations
List of pastoral leases in Western Australia

Notes

Homesteads in Western Australia
Pastoral leases in Western Australia
Stations (Australian agriculture)
Goldfields-Esperance
1896 establishments in Australia